Wolverhampton City Council elections were held on 2 May 2002.

The Labour Party kept overall control of the Council following the election.

Election result

External links
Local Election Results for May 2002

2002
2000s in the West Midlands (county)
2002 English local elections